The 2019–20 season is Banfield's 7th consecutive season in the top division of Argentine football. In addition to the Primera División, the club are competing in the Copa Argentina and Copa de la Superliga.

The season generally covers the period from 1 July 2019 to 30 June 2020.

Review

Pre-season
The first player to announce his departure from Banfield was left-back Adrián Sporle, who agreed a move to Dundee United of the Scottish Championship on 13 June 2019. Adrián Calello followed Sporle out the door, as the defensive midfielder rejoined Huracán on 19 June. Esteban Conde's arrival from Nacional was set on 20 June, following the goalkeeper's exit from the Uruguayan outfit being confirmed a day before. Banfield met Victoriano Arenas in back-to-back friendlies on 22 June, with the first encounter ending in a four-goal victory before the second ended goalless. Jonás Gutiérrez made his unofficial bow against Victoriano Arenas, having been signed days prior. He was followed to the club by Hernán Toledo (Deportivo Maldonado) and Israel Damonte (Huracán).

Their second pre-season encounter took place on 26 June against Argentino, as they again scored four unanswered goals with Hernán Toledo netting on his first appearance; Banfield, like with Victoriano Arenas, faced Argentino twice, with the other fixture ending in a 1–1 draw. Chacarita Juniors of the second tier were beaten 2–1 on 29 June in the first of two friendlies, as Agustín Fontana netted twice to take his pre-season goal tally to five; game two ended in defeat. A number of players loaned in/out in the previous campaign returned on and around 30 June. Nicolás Silva departed on 1 July as he joined Argentinos Juniors. Banfield made it four wins from pre-season on 3 July, defeating Arsenal de Sarandí 3–0; a secondary meet ended goalless at the Estadio Florencio Sola.

Luciano Lollo was snapped up on loan from River Plate on 6 July. A 0–0 draw and a 2–3 loss occurred on 9 July in a friendly with Patronato. Banfield and Vélez Sarsfield swapped victories in friendlies on 13 July. Sebastián Dubarbier put pen to paper with Banfield on 13 July, having previously played in the Spanish Segunda División for Deportivo La Coruña. Sergio Vittor, a centre-back from Racing Club, was loaned in by Hernán Crespo on 17 July. Emanuel Coronel (Brown) and Michael López (Fénix) were loaned out on 19 July, as Denis Brizuela headed to Villa Dálmine. Another loan deal was confirmed on that date, with Facundo Altamirano going to Buenos Aires' Estudiantes. Banfield fought Atlético Tucumán twice on 20 July, winning 1–0 and drawing 2–2.

Julián Carranza was sold to Major League Soccer's Inter Miami on 26 July, though was immediately loaned back until the end of the year.

July
Banfield fell to defeat in the Primera División on their 2019–20 bow, losing one-nil away to Arsenal de Sarandí on 29 July.

August
Banfield and Talleres announced, on 1 August, a loan swap was agreed involving Martín Payero and Junior Arias, with the two switching clubs until 30 June 2020. A penalty from Nicolás Bertolo sealed three points in the league against Estudiantes on 4 August. Banfield beat Sacachispas in a friendly on 7 August, as a goal from Matías Moya was followed by a brace from Agustín Fontana. A friendly with Ferro Carril Oeste was cancelled on 9 August due to poor weather. Mauricio Asenjo completed a loan to Nueva Chicago on 14 August. Banfield made it back-to-back away defeats in the Primera División on 16 August, as they lost to Argentinos Juniors at the Estadio Diego Armando Maradona. Banfield lost to Boca Juniors on 25 August, having conceded after just twenty seconds.

On 31 August, Banfield and Defensa y Justicia played out a goalless draw in the league in Buenos Aires.

September
Hernán Crespo parted ways with Banfield on 2 September, following just one win in five matches to start 2019–20. Julio César Falcioni was revealed as Crespo's replacement on 5 September.

Squad

Transfers
Domestic transfer windows:3 July 2019 to 24 September 201920 January 2020 to 19 February 2020.

Transfers in

Transfers out

Loans in

Loans out

Friendlies

Pre-season
In early June 2019, exhibition matches were announced with Arsenal de Sarandí (3 July) and Patronato (9 July). On 19 June, Banfield added further friendlies with Victoriano Arenas (22 June), Chacarita Juniors (29 June), Vélez Sarsfield, Atlético Tucumán and an unknown opponent; though the latter never took place. The venue for the Chacarita friendly was confirmed on 23 July. Games with Argentino were scheduled on 20 June. Details for the Vélez Sarsfield encounter were released on 8 July.

Mid-season
Ferro Carril Oeste were pencilled in for a mid-season friendly match on 6 August 2019 for 10 August, though was later moved to a day prior. Before facing Ferro, Banfield would meet Sacachispas.

Competitions

Primera División

League table

Relegation table

Source: AFA

Results summary

Matches
The fixtures for the 2019–20 campaign were released on 10 July.

Copa Argentina

Banfield were drawn to meet divisional rivals Talleres in the round of thirty-two in the Copa Argentina, with the encounter getting a date of 10 September; though it was originally tentatively scheduled for August.

Copa de la Superliga

Squad statistics

Appearances and goals

Statistics accurate as of 31 August 2019.

Goalscorers

Notes

References

Club Atlético Banfield seasons
Banfield